The 1995–96 Irish League Cup (known as the Wilkinson Sword League Cup for sponsorship reasons) was the 10th edition of Northern Ireland's secondary football knock-out cup competition. It concluded on 19 September 1995 with the final.

Ards were the defending champions after their first League Cup win last season; a 2–0 penalty shootout victory over Cliftonville in the previous final. This season they went out in the second round to Coleraine, who had been runners-up for the past two seasons. Portadown were the eventual winners, lifting the cup for the first time with a 2–1 victory over Crusaders in the final.

First round

|}

Second round

|}

Quarter-finals

|}

Semi-finals

|}

Final

References

Lea
1995–96 domestic association football cups
1995–96